Vallecitos may refer to:

Places 
Vallecitos, an unincorporated community in San Diego County, California
Vallecitos de Zaragoza, a town in Guerrero, Mexico

Other 
Vallecitos Nuclear Center a nuclear reactor in Alameda County, California
Vallecitos, a ski resort in Argentina
Vallecitos Water District, a public agency in San Diego County, California that provides water, wastewater and reclamation services